Jakson Ragnar Follmann (born 14 March 1992), sometimes known as just Follmann, is a Brazilian  singer and former professional footballer who last played as a goalkeeper for Brazilian club Chapecoense.

Follmann is one of just six survivors in the crash of LaMia Airlines Flight 2933 which killed 71 people including 19 Chapecoense players.

During his career as a professional footballer, he used to play the guitar and sing as a hobby. Having sustained career-ending injuries in a plane crash, he was forced to retire early and later decided to pursue a career in music.

Club career
Born in Alecrim, Rio Grande do Sul, Follmann joined Grêmio's youth setup in 2008, but left in the following year for Juventude. Promoted to the latter's first team during the 2010 season, he only became a regular starter in the 2012 season.

On 28 December 2012 Follmann returned to Grêmio, as a partnership between the club and Juventude was established. As third-choice behind Marcelo Grohe and Tiago Machowski, he only appeared rarely for the club, with the vast majority of his contributions being in the Campeonato Gaúcho.

On 14 November 2014, Follmann was loaned to Linense until the end of 2015 Campeonato Paulista. His first and only appearances for the club came on the following 20 March, coming on as a half-time substitute for ever-present Anderson in a 0–0 away draw against Ituano.

On 5 November 2015, Follmann rescinded his contract with Grêmio and joined URT. He made his debut for the club on 31 January, starting in a 0–0 draw versus Cruzeiro, and was an undisputed starter as the club impressed in the 2016 Campeonato Mineiro by reaching the semifinals of the competition.

After impressing with URT, Follmann signed for Chapecoense on 10 May 2016. A backup to Danilo, he made his first (and only) appearance for the club on 26 August by starting in a 0–1 Copa Sudamericana away loss against Cuiabá.

On 28 November 2016, Follmann was one of six survivors when LaMia Airlines Flight 2933 crashed during a flight from Santa Cruz, Bolivia to Medellín, Colombia. As a result of the accident, one of his legs needed to be amputated.

Recovery and Paralympics
Three months after the career ending disaster, Follmann posted a video on Instagram in which he showed great physical recovery, having fully adapted to the use of a prosthetic leg. Follmann plans to represent Brazil at the paralympic level of football.

Career statistics

Honours
Juventude
Campeonato Gaúcho Sub-20: 2010
Copa FGF: 2011

Chapecoense
 Copa Sudamericana: 2016

References

External links

1992 births
Living people
Sportspeople from Rio Grande do Sul
Brazilian people of German descent
Brazilian footballers
Association football goalkeepers
Campeonato Brasileiro Série D players
Esporte Clube Juventude players
Grêmio Foot-Ball Porto Alegrense players
Clube Atlético Linense players
União Recreativa dos Trabalhadores players
Associação Chapecoense de Futebol players
Survivors of aviation accidents or incidents
LaMia Flight 2933
Brazilian amputees